"Clearest Blue" is a song by Scottish synth-pop band Chvrches and the third single from their second studio album, Every Open Eye.

Background
While talking about the origins of the song on the Song Exploder podcast, Martin Doherty and Iain Cook explained that the trio originally intended "Clearest Blue" to be a laid back song with just two chords, but because they're notoriously bad at sticking to their own rules, they ended up with something completely divergent from those principles. After coming up with the base sample, they bounced ideas around, with Martin adding "nonsense vocals" to establish the basic cadences of the song. Lauren Mayberry began writing the lyrics to replace these vocals, but found herself frequently concerned that her pessimism would bleed through into the lyrics of the song in parts intended to be hopeful and optimistic. The song is typically described as building and building until it ultimately explodes at its melodic climax, but Doherty described it as more of an analytical climax, and that the vocal approach is not intended to be "super climactic, like punch[ing] the air" and that it is better described as a "moment of rest."

Live performances
"Clearest Blue" debuted at Ottawa Bluesfest on 15 July 2015 as the opening song of Chvrches' first show since the conclusion of their 2013–2014 The Bones of What You Believe tour. The song was further promoted by Chvrches in a number of live appearances, including at the Pitchfork Music Festival and The Late Late Show with James Corden.

Critical reception
"Clearest Blue" received positive acclaim from critics. NME called this song "the album's most heart-bursting moment". A review from Stereogum said this "might be the strongest for a simple reason: it builds and builds and builds and doesn’t break down until you’ve nearly lost faith that it will". Spin called the song "earnest and danceable" and praised its powerful opening notes, but "the song really blossoms about halfway through with an absolutely breathtaking breakdown that bursts through the tension they've been building up."

Music video
A music video for the song was released on 19 February 2016.

Use in popular culture 
"Clearest Blue" is featured in the soundtrack of Forza Horizon 3, playing on the in-game radio station Horizon Pulse. It is also included in the soundtrack to season 1 of The Politician. The song is also featured in season 1, episode 3 of Netflix's Heartstopper.

Track listing

Charts

References

2015 singles
2015 songs
Chvrches songs
Virgin Records singles
Songs written by Iain Cook
Songs written by Lauren Mayberry
Songs written by Martin Doherty
Music videos directed by Warren Fu